Gonzales County is a county in the U.S. state of Texas, adjacent to Greater Austin-San Antonio. As of the 2020 census, its population was 19,653. The county is named for its county seat, the city of Gonzales. The county was created in 1836 and organized the following year. As of August 2020, under strict budgetary limitations, the County of Gonzales government-body is unique in that it claims to have no commercial paper, regarding it as "the absence of any county debt."

According to the census, all areas county-wide had $188,099,000 in total annual payroll (2016), $550,118,900 (±39,442,212; 2018) in aggregate annual income, and $238,574,000 in total annual retail sales (2012). In 2018, the census valued all real estate in the county at an aggregate $795,242,300 (±74,643,103); with an aggregate $29,058,000 of real estate being listed for sale and $173,100 listed for rent. In the same year, approximately, the top 5% of households made an average of $361,318; the top 20% averaged at $188,699; the fourth quintile at $79,601; the third quintile (median income) at $53,317; the second quintile at $31,238; and the lowest at $13,339. The Texas Almanac rated all categories of land in the county at an aggregate value of $5.6-billion.

History

 Paleo-Indians Hunter-gatherers were here thousands of years ago; the later Coahuiltecan, Tonkawa, and Karankawa migrated into the area in the 14th century, but lost much of their population by the 18th century due to new infectious diseases contracted by contact with European explorers. The historic Comanche and Waco tribes later migrated into the area and competed most with European American settlers of the nineteenth century.
 1519–1685 Hernando Cortez and Alonso Álvarez de Pineda claim Texas for Spain.
 1685–1690 France plants its flag on Texas soil, but departs after only five years.
 1821 Mexico won its independence from Spain. Citizens of the United States began to settle in Texas and were granted Mexican citizenship.
 1825
Green DeWitt's petition for a land grant to establish a colony in Texas is approved by the Mexican government.
Gonzales is established and named for Rafael Gonzales, governor of Coahuila y Tejas.
 1828 When Jean Louis Berlandier visits, he finds settler cabins, a fort-like barricade, agriculture and livestock, as well as nearby villages of Tonkawa and Karankawa.
 1831 The Coahuila y Tejas government sends a six-pound cannon to Gonzales for settlers' protection against Indian raids.
 1835
The colony sends delegates to conventions (1832–1835) to discuss disagreements with Mexico.
September – The Mexican government views the conventions as treason. Troops are sent to Gonzales to retrieve the cannon.
October 2 – The Battle of Gonzales becomes the first shots fired in the Texas Revolution. The colonists put up armed resistance, with the cannon pointed at the Mexican troops, and above it a banner proclaiming, "Come and take it". Commemoration of the event becomes the annual "Come and Take It Festival".
October 13 – December 9 – Siege of Bexar becomes the first major campaign of the Texas Revolution.
 1836
Gonzales County is established.
February 23 – Alamo messenger Launcelot Smithers carries to the people of Gonzales, the Colonel William Barret Travis letter stating the enemy is in sight and requesting men and provisions.
February 24 – Captain Albert Martin delivers to Smithers in Gonzales the infamous "Victory or Death" Travis letter addressed "To the People of Texas and All Americans in the World" stating the direness of the situation. Smithers then takes the letter to San Felipe, site of the provisional Texas government.
February 27 – The Gonzales Alamo Relief Force of 32 men, led by Lieutenant George C. Kimble, depart to join the 130 fighters already at the Alamo.
March 1 – The Gonzales "Immortal 32" make their way inside the Alamo.
March 2 – Texas Declaration of Independence from Mexico establishes the Republic of Texas.
March 6 – The Alamo falls.
March 13–14  – Susanna Dickinson, the widow of the Alamo defender Almaron Dickinson, arrives in Gonzales with her daughter Angelina and Colonel Travis' slave Joe. Upon hearing the news of the Alamo, Sam Houston orders the town of Gonzales torched to the ground, and establishes his headquarters under a county oak tree.
 1838 Gonzales men found the town of Walnut Springs (later Seguin) in the northwest section of the county.
 1840 Gonzales men join the Battle of Plum Creek against Buffalo Hump and his Comanches.
 1850 Gonzales College is founded by slave-owning planters, and is the first institution in Texas to confer A.B. degrees on women.
 1853 The Gonzales Inquirer begins publication.
 1860 County population is 8,059, including 3,168 slaves.
 1861
County votes 802–80 in favor of secession from the Union.
February 1 – Texas secedes from the Union
March 2 – Texas joins the Confederate States of America
 1866–1876 The Sutton–Taylor feud, which involves outlaw John Wesley Hardin, and is reportedly the bloodiest and longest in Texas history. Hardin's men are known to have stayed in the community of Pilgrim.
 1870, March 30 – The United States Congress readmits Texas into the Union.
 1874 The Galveston, Harrisburg and San Antonio Railway is built through the eastern and northern part of the county.
 1877 The Texas and New Orleans Railway comes to the county.
 1881 The Gonzales Branch Railroad is chartered.
 1885 The San Antonio and Aransas Pass Railway runs through the county.
 1894 John Wesley Hardin is released from prison and returns to Gonzales, where he passes the bar exam and practices law.
 1898 Twenty-three county men serve, with two casualties, during the Spanish–American War. Three serve with the Rough Riders.
 1905 The Southern Pacific line bypasses the community of Rancho.
 World War I – 1,106 men from the county serve.
 1935 – Governor James V. Allred dedicates a monument in the community of Cost, commemorating the first shot of the Texas Revolution. Sculptress is Waldine A. Tauch.
 1936 Palmetto State Park opens to the public.
 1939 The Gonzales Warm Springs Foundation opens for the treatment of polio.
 World War II – 3,000 men from Gonzales County serve, with 79 casualties.

Geography

Directly connected to the  corridor, the Gonzales County areas support average annual daily traffic rated at over 100,000 vehicles by the Texas Department of Transportation; due to its direct adjacency to Greater Austin and Greater San Antonio.

River crossings
Gonzales County and the Texas Department of Transportation provide bridges across the Guadalupe River and the San Marcos River.

 North  bridge; Belmont, Extreme-West Gonzales County
 North  / Gonzales County Road 143 bridge; Monthalia, West Gonzales County
 North  bridge; City of Gonzales, Texas
 East  US 90A /  bridge; San Marcos River, Ottine

Major highways

 , Belmont-Ottine-Waelder (San Antonio—Houston)
 , Gonzales-to-Austin, Belmont-Leesville-Nixon
  U.S. Highway 87, Nixon-Smiley to Floresville
  State Highway 97, Waelder—City of Gonzales—Bebe-Leesville
  State Highway 304, Gonzales-to-Bastrop
  U.S. Highway 90 Alternate, Belmont—City of Gonzales (I-10 auxiliary)

Arteries
The majority of the county's arterial roads have had their names removed and replaced by "County Road" numbered designations. Very few major roads remain properly named on record for Gonzales County, especially outside incorporated areas, including:

 Capote Road, Belmont-Leesville to Seguin
 Salt Lake Road (CR 266), North Ottine
 Harwood Road (CR 230), North Harwood to City-of-Gonzales
 Double Live Oak Lane, North Waelder

Adjacent counties
 Caldwell County (north)
 Fayette County (northeast)
 Lavaca County (east)
 Dewitt County (south)
 Karnes County (southwest)
 Wilson County (west)
 Guadalupe County (northwest)

Demographics

Note: the US Census treats Hispanic/Latino as an ethnic category. This table excludes Latinos from the racial categories and assigns them to a separate category. Hispanics/Latinos can be of any race.

As of the census of 2000, there were 18,628 people, 6,782 households, and 4,876 families residing in the county.  The population density was 17 people per square mile (7/km2).  There were 8,194 housing units at an average density of 8 per square mile (3/km2).  The racial makeup of the county was 72.25% White, 8.39% Black or African American, 0.53% Native American, 0.26% Asian, 0.09% Pacific Islander, 16.48% from other races, and 2.01% from two or more races.  39.62% of the population were Hispanic or Latino of any race.

There were 6,782 households, out of which 34.20% had children under the age of 18 living with them, 54.00% were married couples living together, 12.30% had a female householder with no husband present, and 28.10% were non-families. 25.20% of all households were made up of individuals, and 14.30% had someone living alone who was 65 years of age or older.  The average household size was 2.69 and the average family size was 3.21.

In the county, the population was spread out, with 28.00% under the age of 18, 8.70% from 18 to 24, 25.70% from 25 to 44, 20.90% from 45 to 64, and 16.80% who were 65 years of age or older.  The median age was 36 years. For every 100 females there were 98.40 males.  For every 100 females age 18 and over, there were 95.00 males.

The median income for a household in the county was $28,368, and the median income for a family was $35,218. Males had a median income of $23,439 versus $17,027 for females. The per capita income for the county was $14,269.  About 13.80% of families and 18.60% of the population were below the poverty line, including 23.60% of those under age 18 and 19.40% of those age 65 or over.

Politics

Communities

Cities
 Gonzales (county seat)
 Nixon (small part in Wilson County)
 Smiley
 Waelder

Unincorporated areas
 Bebe
 Belmont
 Leesville
 Ottine

Ghost towns

 Albuquerque
 Cheapside
 Cost
 Harwood
 Monthalia
 Pilgrim
 Thompsonville
 Wrightsboro

See also

 National Register of Historic Places listings in Gonzales County, Texas
 Recorded Texas Historic Landmarks in Gonzales County

References

External links
 Gonzales County government's website
 

 
1837 establishments in the Republic of Texas
Populated places established in 1837